Fuxing  is a subdistrict of Xingnin City, Meizhou, in eastern Guangdong Province, China.

References 

Township-level divisions of Guangdong
Xingning, Guangdong